Lieutenant General Sir Henry Frederick Bouverie  (11 July 1783 – 14 November 1852) was a British Army officer.

Military career
He was the son of Edward Bouverie MP, of Delapré Abbey, Hardingstone in Northamptonshire, and his wife, Harriet Fawkener, the only daughter and sole heiress of Sir Everard Fawkener; and nephew of the 1st Earl of Radnor. Bouverie was educated at Eton College and commissioned a Cornet in the 2nd Dragoon Guards in 1799, transferring to the Coldstream Guards as an Ensign a few months later. He spent the rest of his regimental career in the Coldstreams.

For his services during the Peninsular War,  he received the Army Gold Cross, with one clasp, for the battles of Salamanca, Vitoria, San Sebastian, the Nive, and Orthez. He became General Officer Commanding Northern Command in 1828 and Governor of Malta in 1836.

A stained east window was erected to the General on 9 February 1869 at St Edmunds Church, Hardingstone by the tenants and other inhabitants of the parish.

References

 

|-

1783 births
1853 deaths
People educated at Eton College
Governors and Governors-General of Malta
British Army lieutenant generals
Recipients of the Army Gold Cross
People from Hardingstone
Coldstream Guards officers
Knights Grand Cross of the Order of the Bath
Knights Grand Cross of the Order of St Michael and St George
British Army personnel of the Peninsular War